TEMP (upper air soundings) is a set of World Meteorological Organization (WMO) alphanumerical codes used for reporting weather observations of the upper regions of the atmosphere made by weather balloons released from the surface level (either at land or at sea). The WMO designates the FM-35 numerical code for surface TEMPs and the FM-36 numerical code for ship-based TEMPs.

In the next link, you can find the format (Manual on Codes) page 85

https://library.wmo.int/doc_num.php?explnum_id=10235

Earth sciences data formats